Glebe is a townland in County Westmeath, Ireland.

Glebe is one of 11 townlands of the civil parish of Taghmon in the barony of Corkaree in the Province of Leinster.

The neighbouring townlands are: Foxburrow to the north, Taghmon to the south–east, Rathcorbally and Monkstown to the south and Taghmon to the east and north.

In the 1911 census of Ireland there were 2 houses and 15 inhabitants in the townland.

Glebe was the name given to an area of land within an ecclesiastical parish used to support a parish priest. As a townland name it is repeated many times across the country.

References

External links
Map of Glebe at openstreetmap.org
Glebe at the IreAtlas Townland Data Base
Glebe at Townlands.ie
Glebe at The Placenames Database of Ireland

Townlands of County Westmeath